Emil Orlik (21 July 1870 – 28 September 1932) was a painter, etcher and lithographer. He was born in Prague, which was at that time part of the Austro-Hungarian Empire, and lived and worked in Prague, Austria and Germany.

Biography
Emil Orlik was the son of a tailor. He first studied art at the private art school of Heinrich Knirr, where one of his fellow pupils was Paul Klee. From 1891, he studied at the Munich Academy under Wilhelm Lindenschmit. Later he learned engraving from Johann Leonhard Raab and proceeded to experiment with various printmaking processes.

After completing his military service in Prague, he returned to Munich, where he worked for the magazine Jugend. He spent most of 1898, travelling through Europe, visiting the Netherlands, Great Britain, Belgium, and Paris. During this time he became aware of Japanese art, and the impact it was having in Europe, and decided to visit Japan to learn woodcut techniques. He left for Asia in March 1900, stopping off in Hong Kong, before reaching Japan, where he stayed until  February 1901.

In 1905 Emil Orlik moved to Berlin and took a post at the "School for Graphic and Book Art" of the Museum of Decorative Arts (Kunstgewerbemuseum), now part of the Berlin State Museums. He taught at the Berlin College of Arts and Crafts, where one of his students was George Grosz.

Orlik's work is held in the permanent collections of several museums worldwide, including the Princeton University Art Museum, the British Museum, the Museum of Modern Art, the University of Michigan Museum of Art, the Worcester Art Museum, the Harvard Art Museums, the Clark Art Institute, the Chazen Museum of Art, the Brooklyn Museum, the National Museum of Western Art, the Cleveland Museum of Art, the Artizon Museum, the Fine Arts Museum of San Francisco, the Portland Art Museum, the Fairfield University Museum, and the Metropolitan Museum of Art.

Gallery

References

External links 

 
 Emil Orlik prints, books, artwork and biography
 Emil Orlik (1870–1932) - Portraits of Friends and Contemporaries [description of exhibition in 2004]. Jewish Museum in Prague (Czech Republic)
 Guide to the Emil Orlik Collection at the Leo Baeck Institute, New York.
 

1870 births
1932 deaths
19th-century Austrian Jews
19th-century Austrian painters
19th-century Austrian male artists
Austrian male painters
20th-century Austrian painters
Czech etchers
Austrian etchers
Lithographers
Czech painters
Czech male painters
Czech scenic designers
Austrian expatriates in Japan
Austrian expatriates in Germany
Czech expatriates in Japan
Czech expatriates in Germany
Artists from Prague
19th-century lithographers
20th-century lithographers
Color engravers
Members of the Vienna Secession
20th-century Austrian male artists
20th-century engravers